Minuscule 161 (in the Gregory-Aland numbering), ε 1005 (Soden), is a Greek minuscule manuscript of the New Testament, on parchment. Palaeographically it has been assigned to the 10th century. The manuscript is lacunose.
It has full marginalia.

Description 

The codex contains the text of the four Gospels on 203 thick parchment leaves (size ), with one large lacuna (John 16:4-21:25).

The text is written two columns per page, in 23-26 lines per page, in brown ink, the capital letters in red and gold.

There is also a division according to the Ammonian Sections, with references to the Eusebian Canons (written below Ammonian Section numbers).

Lectionary markings were added by a later hand (for liturgical use).

Various readings are often noted in its margin.

Text 
Kurt Aland the Greek text of the codex did not place in any Category.
According to the Claremont Profile Method it represents textual family Λ.

The Pericope Adulterae (John 7:53-8:11) is marked by an obelus. It contains western readings both in text (in John 3:6; 7:29; Luke 24:25) and in its marginal scholia.

History 

The manuscript was examined by Andrew Birch (about 1782). C. R. Gregory saw the manuscript in 1886.

It is currently housed at the Vatican Library (Barb. gr. 352), at Rome.

See also 

 List of New Testament minuscules
 Biblical manuscript
 Textual criticism

References

Further reading 

 

Greek New Testament minuscules
10th-century biblical manuscripts
Manuscripts of the Vatican Library